Syria (SYR) competed at the 1979 Mediterranean Games in Split, Yugoslavia. The medal tally was 1.

See also
 Syria at the 1983 Mediterranean Games

Nations at the 1979 Mediterranean Games
1979
Mediterranean Games